Ecstasea is a luxury yacht, the biggest Feadship built when she was launched. In June 2009 she was sold by her original owner, the Russian oligarch Roman Abramovich, to Alshair Fiyaz by yacht brokers Merle Wood.

Design
Ordered by Russian oligarch Roman Abramovich, Ecstasea was built in 2004 as the largest Feadship ever built. The yacht is made of all steel, and is much closer to a luxury ship, than to a yacht.

Her exterior design was created by the teamwork of Terence Disdale and De Voogt Naval Architects, with Disdale also responsible for the yacht's Asian-style interior. David Waite-Wright, who was Senior Designer at Disdales, oversaw the project. The yacht later went on to win multiple interior design awards.
She has capacity for 14 passengers, who are divided into 6 separate rooms.

Engine 
The yacht has four main MTU engines with a combined power of 12,444 hp. The builder also installed a General Electric LM2500 gas turbine on board, which produces 30,843 hp. The total combined horsepower of 43,287 hp allows the yacht to reach a maximum speed of more than 30 knots. The maximum speed with only the diesel engines working is 25 knots. The cruising speed (diesel only) is 22 knots.

Incidents 
On December 15, 2019, Ecstasea clipped the Simpson Bay Bridge, St. Maarten.  The yacht sustained minor hull damage, but a small operation room attached to the bridge was destroyed and fell into the bay.  This incident was captured on video and posted to Reddit.  It is estimated that the vessel was traveling at less than 3 knots.

The St. Maarten Daily Herald reported that this was not the first time the booth has been damaged by incoming vessels.  In this particular incident, the yacht was blown off course by “adverse current and wind conditions.”  The operator was able to escape the booth in time, and the bridge itself was not substantively damaged, neither were the controls.  The bridge resumed normal operations on Monday, December 16.

See also 
List of motor yachts by length
Pelorus

References

External links

Ecstasea at MonacoEye.com
Ecstasea Jet engine at youtube

2004 ships
Individual yachts
Motor yachts
Roman Abramovich